"Georgia on My Mind" is a 1930 song written by Hoagy Carmichael and Stuart Gorrell and first recorded that same year by Hoagy Carmichael. However, the song has been most often associated with soul singer Ray Charles, who was a native of the U.S. state of Georgia and recorded it for his 1960 album The Genius Hits the Road. 

In 1979, the State of Georgia designated Ray Charles' version the official state song. The song has become part of the Great American Songbook tradition.

Background and original recording

It has been asserted that Hoagy Carmichael wrote the song about his sister, Georgia. But Carmichael wrote in his second autobiography Sometimes I Wonder that saxophonist Frankie Trumbauer told him he should write a song about the state of Georgia. He jokingly volunteered the first two words, "Georgia, Georgia...", which Carmichael ended up using while working on the song with his roommate, Stuart Gorrell, who wrote the lyrics. Gorrell's name was absent from the copyright, but Carmichael sent him royalty checks anyway.

Carmichael recorded "Georgia on My Mind", with Bix Beiderbecke on cornet, in New York City on September 15, 1930.

Ray Charles version

In 1960, Ray Charles, a native of Georgia, recorded a version of the song that went to No. 1 on the Billboard magazine Hot 100. Charles' hit rendition would become the most widely-known version of the tune from this time on. It would also be the song most associated with his musical career.

In 1977, Robert Grossman, James Picker and Craig Whitaker created a clay animation short, Jimmy the C, in which U.S. President Jimmy Carter sings in Ray Charles' version of the song.

In 1979, the song was designated the State Song of Georgia, and Charles was invited to perform it at the state capitol. 

The TV series Designing Women used an instrumental version of "Georgia on My Mind" as its opening theme. During the opening credits of the show's sixth season in 1991, Charles performed his version of the song live on piano while the show's cast looked as the opening credits.

In 2003, Rolling Stone magazine named the Ray Charles version of "Georgia on My Mind" the 44th greatest song of all time.

Chart

Ella Fitzgerald version 
In 1962, famed jazz singer Ella Fitzgerald released a rendition of the song, produced by Norman Granz, on the album Ella Swings Gently with Nelson.

The Hawks/The Band version 
The song was a standard at performances by Ronnie Hawkins and The Hawks, where it was sung by pianist Richard Manuel after 1964. When The Hawks broke up and formed The Band, they kept the song in their repertoire. They recorded a studio version of the song for Jimmy Carter's presidential bid in 1976. It was released as a single that year as well as on their 1977 album Islands.

Willie Nelson version

Willie Nelson recorded the song on Stardust, his 1978 album of standards. It was released as single, peaked at No. 1 for a single week, and ranked for sixteen weeks on a country chart.

The original lyrics, including the commonly excised introductory verse, are in the Georgia Code under license.

Chart activity

See also
List of 1930s jazz standards
Spirit of Atlanta Drum and Bugle Corps

References

1930 songs
1930s jazz standards
Songs with music by Hoagy Carmichael
Ray Charles songs
Billboard Hot 100 number-one singles
Grammy Award for Best Male Pop Vocal Performance
Grammy Hall of Fame Award recipients
Songs about Georgia (U.S. state)
United States state songs
ABC Records singles
Columbia Records singles
EMI Records singles
Victor Records singles
Pop standards